Herbert Coleman (born September 4, 1971) is a former American football defensive lineman who played one season with the Saskatchewan Roughriders of the Canadian Football League (CFL) . He was drafted by the San Francisco 49ers of the National Football League (NFL) in the seventh round of the 1995 NFL Draft. He played college football at Trinity International University and attended Hillcrest High School in Country Club Hills, Illinois. Coleman was also a member of the Kansas City Chiefs, New Orleans Saints, Rhein Fire, Milwaukee Mustangs, Denver Broncos, Orlando Predators and Colorado Crush.

College career
Coleman played for the Trinity International Trojans from 1989 to 1990. He then transferred to South Suburban College to improve his grades while also working at a post office. He  later returned to Trinity International to finish his college education, while playing for the Trojans.

Professional career
Coleman was selected by the San Francisco 49ers NFL with the 238th pick in the 1995 NFL Draft and signed with the team on June 29, 1995. He was released by the 49ers on August 20 and signed to the team's practice squad on August 28, 1995. He was released by the 49ers on August 20, 1996. On August 27, 1996, Coleman was signed to the practice squad of the Kansas City Chiefs of the NFL. On December 4, 1996, he was signed to the practice squad of the New Orleans Saints of the NFL. He signed with the San Francisco 49ers on January 24, 1997. Coleman played for the Rhein Fire of the World League of American Football during the 1997 season. He was released by the 49ers on August 19, 1997. He was signed by the Milwaukee Mustangs of the Arena Football League (AFL) on January 9, 1998. Coleman was placed on Other League Exempt by the Mustangs on January 23, 1998 upon joining the CFL's Saskatchewan Roughriders. He signed with the Roughriders in 1998 and played in two games, starting both, for the team during the 1998 season. He was placed on Other League Exempt by the Mustangs on March 10, 1999 upon joining the Denver Broncos of the NFL. Coleman was signed by the Broncos in March 1999. He was released by the Broncos on August 10, 1999. The Milwaukee Mustangs traded his  rights to the Orlando Predators for Chris Barber on April 1, 1999. The Predators traded Coleman and Alvin Ashley to the Mustangs for Ernest Allen on November 4, 1999. Herb played for the Mustangs during the 2000 season. He signed with the AFL's Colorado Crush on November 22, 2002 and played for the team during the 2003 season. He was placed on the refused to report list on January 12, 2004 and released by the Crush on November 15, 2004.

References

External links
Just Sports Stats

Living people
1971 births
American football defensive linemen
Canadian football defensive linemen
African-American players of American football
African-American players of Canadian football
Trinity International Trojans football players
South Suburban College alumni
San Francisco 49ers players
Kansas City Chiefs players
New Orleans Saints players
Rhein Fire players
Milwaukee Mustangs (1994–2001) players
Saskatchewan Roughriders players
Denver Broncos players
Orlando Predators players
Colorado Crush players
Players of American football from Illinois
Sportspeople from Cook County, Illinois
People from Country Club Hills, Illinois
21st-century African-American sportspeople
20th-century African-American sportspeople